Edo Bertoglio (born 1951 in Lugano) is a Swiss photographer and film director. He is the director of Downtown 81.

Life and work
Edo Bertoglio received his degree in film directing and editing at the Conservatoire Libre du Cinema Francais in Paris in 1975. He moved to New York City in 1976, where he found work as a photographer for Italian Vogue, and Andy Warhol's Interview, and other magazines. He became involved in the downtown art and music scenes of the late 70s and early 80s. During this time he was married to fashion designer Maripol, whom he has since divorced. He also took his photography experience and familiarity to rock music to do photographic work for the covers of LPs, completing many assignments for Atlantic, Arista, Chrysalis Records and Warner Brothers Records. He photographed The Bongos for RCA Records and for GQ Magazine. He also worked on Glenn O'Brien's late night countercultural talk show TV Party.

In 1980, Bertoglio and Maripol secured backing from Rizzoli, through Fiorucci, to produce a film (with rock critic Glenn O'Brien) about the No Wave music scene and the general Lower East Side milieu. The film, titled New York Beat, was directed by Bertoglio, and young graffiti writer and future artist Jean-Michel Basquiat played the lead role, which was written by O’Brien to mirror his real life. The no-wave bands DNA, Tuxedomoon, The Plastics, James Chance and the Contortions, and others appear in the movie, as well as Kid Creole and the Coconuts. Fab Five Freddy, Deborah Harry and others play bit parts. After shooting finished in January 1981 Rizzoli pulled out of funding the project, and footage lay unedited for almost 20 years until it was released under the title Downtown 81 in 2000.

Bertoglio left New York for his hometown of Lugano, Switzerland, in 1990. He later returned to the world of Downtown 81, writing and directing the film Face Addict, released in 2005. He also plays a main part in the film, along with artist and musician Walter Steding, as the pair walk through memories of New York in the punk era, talking to such figures as Deborah Harry, Maripol, John Lurie, Glenn O’Brien, and others about the time. A poetic pseudo-documentary mixing original footage with retrospective commentary, the film was less critically or commercially successful than Downtown 81. Edo Bertoglio currently lives in Lugano, producing and directing television commercials and programs for Swiss TV.

References

External links
 
 
 
 
 

Swiss film directors
Swiss photographers
1951 births
Living people